Acuña is one of the 38 municipalities of Coahuila, in north-eastern Mexico. The municipal seat lies at Ciudad Acuña, which contained over 98% of the municipality's population in 2010. The municipality covers an area of 11,487.7 km² and is located on the international border between Mexico and the USA, here formed by the Río Bravo del Norte (Rio Grande), adjacent to the U.S. state of Texas.

In 2015, the municipality had a total population of 181,426 inhabitants. Acuña is currently the fastest growing city in Mexico.

Towns and villages

The largest localities (cities, towns, and villages) are:

Adjacent municipalities and counties

 Jiménez Municipality - southeast
 Zaragoza Municipality - south
 Múzquiz Municipality - south
 Ocampo Municipality - southwest
 Brewster County, Texas - northwest
 Terrell County, Texas - north
 Val Verde County, Texas - northeast

References

Municipalities of Coahuila
Coahuila populated places on the Rio Grande